Ulrich Rückriem (born 30 September 1938) is a German sculptor notable for his monumental stone sculptures. He lives and works in Cologne and London.
His abstract works of art are often assigned to the style of minimalism and process art.

Life and work
Born in Düsseldorf, Rückriem apprenticed as a stonecutter in Düren, then worked as a journeyman at the Dombauhütte workshops of Cologne Cathedral. Later, due to his tight association with Gallery Konrad Fischer, Düsseldorf, he  came into contact with artists and colleagues like Carl Andre, Richard Long, Sol LeWitt, Royden Rabinowitch. From 1963 on, he worked as a free-lance artist.

For a few years he shared a studio with Blinky Palermo, before he started his academic career, at Hochschule für bildende Künste Hamburg (starting from 1974), from 1984 on at Kunstakademie Düsseldorf, and finally at Städelschule,

In the 1960s and 1070s, Rückriem worked in the quarry of Dolomite at Anldorf, museum Städel in Frankfurt am Main, Stedelijk Museum Amsterdam and Neue Nationalgalerie Berlin followed. Rückriem was invited to participate at the documenta i.

Many of the works of art of Rückriem are accessible to the public as public art, mostly in Germany, but also in Spain, France, England, Ireland and others. A particularly impressive one of these is Siglo XX (1995), an installation in the open fields close to the locality of Abiego (Spain). It consists of 20 steles of granite from O Porriño, arranged in a manner analogous to the eight queens puzzle.

A permanent installation of about 100 sculptures by Rückriem is at Sculpture Halls Ulrich Rückriem in Sinsteden, near Cologne. The halls and presentation were devised by the artist himself.

Gallery

See also
 Untitled (Rückriem) (1987), Chicago
 Untitled (1989), Rückriem, Western Washington University Public Sculpture Collection, Bellingham, Washington
 Untitled (1982) Ruckriem, Fattoria di Celle- Collezione Gori, Pistoia, Italy

References

Bibliography
 Ulrich Rückriem: Arbeiten, Editor: Heinrich Erhardt, Oktagon, 1994.  (in German)
 Jürgen Hohmeyer: Ulrich Rückriem, Verlag Silke Schreiber, 1988.   (in German)

External links 

 Ulrich Rückriem – artist biography (Tate Gallery)
 Sculpture Halls Ulrich Rückriem, Sinsteden (in German)
 The World of Ulrich Rückriem – works in public spaces (in German)

1938 births
Living people
20th-century German sculptors
20th-century German male artists
German male sculptors
21st-century German sculptors
21st-century German male artists
Minimalist artists
German contemporary artists